Joel Turner may refer to:

Joel Turner (musician) (born 1987), Australian beatboxer
Joel Turner (actor), Australian actor
Joel Turner (mayor) (1820–1888), former Mayor of Los Angeles, California